Jerome "Jeromy" Jaro James (born 11 April 1981) is a Belizean footballer who currently plays for Belmopan Bandits in the Premier League of Belize and the Belize national team.

International career 
James made his national team debut for Belize on 22 January 2008 in a 1–0 friendly loss against El Salvador.

His first competitive appearance was on 6 February 2008 in a 2010 FIFA World Cup qualification match, as a second half substitute, in a 3-1 win against Saint Kitts and Nevis.

James' first, and only international goal to date came in a 4-1 loss to El Salvador on 24 January 2009, in a 2009 UNCAF Nations Cup match.

Beach Soccer 

James is also a member of the Belize national beach soccer team, and represented his country at the 2018 UNCAF Beach Soccer Cup.

References 

1981 births
Living people
Belizean footballers
Belize international footballers
Premier League of Belize players
Association football forwards
Belmopan Bandits players
FC Belize players